Mierzanowo-Kolonia  is a village in the administrative district of Gmina Grudusk, within Ciechanów County, Masovian Voivodeship, in east-central Poland.

References

Mierzanowo-Kolonia